Anisopogon is a genus of robber flies in the family Asilidae. There are at least three described species in Anisopogon.

Species
These three species that belong to the genus Anisopogon:
 Anisopogon glabellus (Roder, 1881) c g
 Anisopogon gracillimus (Lehr, 1970) c g
 Anisopogon parvus (Efflatoun, 1937) c g
Data sources: i = ITIS, c = Catalogue of Life, g = GBIF, b = Bugguide.net

References

Further reading

External links

 
 

Asilidae genera